The Southern Virginia Knights are the athletic teams that represent Southern Virginia University, located in Buena Vista, Virginia, in intercollegiate sports as a member of the Division III level of the National Collegiate Athletic Association (NCAA), primarily competing in the USA South Athletic Conference for most of its sports since the 2021–22 academic year; while its men's volleyball team competes in the Continental Volleyball Conference (CVC).

History
The school's athletics programs historically competed in the National Association of Intercollegiate Athletics (NAIA), and also competed in national tournaments of the United States Collegiate Athletic Association (USCAA). Southern Virginia began its athletic program in the fall of 1997, one year after it became a four-year liberal arts college with an LDS environment. In 1998, the Knights joined the United States Collegiate Athletic Association. The 2012–13 school year was SVU's first year as a provisional NCAA Division III member; it joined the Capital Athletic Conference (now known as the Coast to Coast Athletic Conference) on July 1, 2013, and  became eligible for conference championships in 2014–15. Since the C2C never offered football under either of its names, Southern Virginia joined the New Jersey Athletic Conference for football effective July 2014. After four successful provisional years, the Knights became a full NCAA Division III member on September 1, 2016. On August 9, 2017 Southern Virginia University officially changed its school colors from green and white back to its original colors of crimson and white. Two months later on October 16, 2017 Southern Virginia University announced its football program would switch over to the Old Dominion Athletic Conference starting in the 2019–20 season. On February 20, 2018 the men's volleyball team became the first Southern Virginia program to be nationally ranked; ranking in at number eight in the AVCA and NCAA DIII poll. On July 12, 2018 Southern Virginia announced Women's Field Hockey as a varsity sport becoming the 23rd varsity sport offered at the school. On April 4, 2019 Southern Virginia added men's rugby as a varsity sport to be offered. One week after announcing the addition of men's rugby, on April 11, 2019 Southern Virginia announced the addition of men's and women's swimming and diving. On December 11, 2019, Southern Virginia announced it would join the USA South Athletic Conference, effective beginning in the 2021–22 academic year. Southern Virginia University officially joined the USA South Athletic Conference on July 1, 2021. The newest sport added to Southern Virginia University was announced on August 16th, 2022 with the addition of women’s wrestling.

Classifications

Conference Memberships

Notes

Sports sponsored

A member of the USA South Athletic Conference, Southern Virginia University sponsors teams in fourteen men's, thirteen women's, and three co-ed varsity sports.

Men’s basketball

Women's basketball
The Southern Virginia women’s basketball team won the 2021-22 USA South Athletic Conference tournament championship. In their first ever appearance in the NCAA Division III women's basketball tournament the Knights advanced to the Round of 32, where they fell to the Transylvania Pioneers 55–77.

Men's cross country
In 2021 the Southern Virginia Men's Cross Country team won the USA South Athletic Conference Championship. This was Southern Virginia's first ever conference championship as a member of the USA South Athletic Conference. Runner Dylan May won the individual conference championship for men and was named Runner of the Year, Rookie Runner of the Year, and First Team All-Conference.

Women's cross country
In 2021 the Southern Virginia Women's Cross Country team also won the USA South Athletic Conference Championship.

Football

Men's tennis
For the 2020-21 season the Men's Tennis team won their first ever conference championship as a member of the Coast to Coast Athletic Conference. The men's tennis team then went on to advance to the NCAA Final 8 before being eliminated.

Track and field
The Southern Virginia University men's and women's track team both won the USA South Conference Outdoor Track and Field Championships on April 21, 2022.

Men’s volleyball
On March 30, 2019 the Southern Virginia Men's Volleyball team clinched the CVC regular season championship for the 2018–19 season. This was Southern Virginia's first ever conference championship as an NCAA Division III member. On April 13, 2019 Southern Virginia men's volleyball program captured the University's first conference tournament title and first NCAA DIII Tournament appearance after defeating Juniata College in five-sets.
On April 23, 2021 the Southern Virginia Men's Volleyball team lost in the NCAA Division III Final Four to Benedictine in five sets. This marks the longest a Southern Virginia team has lasted in the school's Division III era.  On April 15, 2022 the Southern Virginia men’s volleyball team lost in the first round of the NCAA Division III men's volleyball tournament to Stevens Institute of Technology.

Women’s volleyball
On November 6th, 2021 the Southern Virginia Women's Volleyball team won the USA South Athletic Conference tournament championship for the 2021–22 season. This was Southern Virginia's first ever women’s volleyball conference championship. In their first ever appearance in the NCAA Division III women's volleyball tournament, the Southern Virginia Women's Volleyball team lost 0–3 to Emory in the first round.

Wrestling
In 2017–18 Nico Ramirez became the first NCAA National Qualifier in Southern Virginia's school history and made it to the second round of the NCAA Division III Wrestling Championships. Starting in the 2022-23 season the wrestling program will compete in the Old Dominion Athletic Conference.

National Championships

Team

— (NCSAA) National Small College Athletic Association— (USCAA) United States Collegiate Athletic Association

Individual

Athletic facilities

Current facilities
Harvey-Dryden Field — Softball
Knight Stadium — Football, Men's and women's soccer, Men's and women's lacrosse, Field hockey
Knight Arena — Men's and women's basketball, Men's and women's volleyball, Wrestling 
Tennis Complex — Men's and women's tennis
Vista Links Golf Course — Men's and women's golf

For baseball, Southern Virginia plays at local high school Parry McCluer High School. And for track and field and swimming Southern Virginia uses Washington and Lee University facilities.

See also
List of Southern Virginia Knights head football coaches

References

External links
 Official website of Southern Virginia Knights Athletics